Sparassis spathulata is a species of fungus in the genus Sparassis.

References

Edible fungi
Fungi of Europe
Fungi of North America
Polyporales